The 2016 Skate America was the first event of six in the 2016–17 ISU Grand Prix of Figure Skating, a senior-level international invitational competition series. It was held at the Sears Centre in Chicago, Illinois, on October 21–23. Medals were awarded in the disciplines of men's singles, ladies' singles, pair skating, and ice dancing. Skaters earned points toward qualifying for the 2016–17 Grand Prix Final.

Entries
The ISU published the preliminary assignments on June 30, 2016.

Changes to preliminary assignments

Results

Men

Ladies

Pairs

Ice dancing

References

External links
 
 2016 Skate America at the International Skating Union

Skate America
Skate America, 2016
Skate America
2010s in Chicago
2016 in Illinois
2016 in sports in Illinois